HMS Rodney was a 74-gun third rate ship of the line of the Royal Navy, launched on 8 December 1809 at Deptford.

The Dockyard was suffering from a shortage of seasoned timber at the time Rodney was being built. In consequence the hull was built from unseasoned wood which quickly shrunk and rotted when exposed to seawater. After just three years at sea all of the hull fastenings had given way and Rodney was returned to Deptford for decommissioning.

In 1827 she was reduced to a 50-gun ship, and in 1836 Rodney was sold out of the Navy.

In commercial service, Rodney collided with the British paddle steamer  at Havana, Cuba, on 11 October 1846, destroying her pinnace, and was driven ashore.

Notes

References

Lavery, Brian (2003) The Ship of the Line - Volume 1: The development of the battlefleet 1650-1850. Conway Maritime Press. .

Vengeur-class ships of the line
1809 ships
Ships built in Deptford
Maritime incidents in October 1846